Cymbiola nobilis tamariskae is a subspecies of sea snail, a marine gastropod mollusk in the family Volutidae, the volutes.

Description

Distribution
This subspecies occurs in the Java Sea

References

 Sutanto, O.; Patamakanthin, S. (2004). Description of a new Cymbiola species from small Islands in the Java Sea, Indonesia. Of Sea Shore 26(3): 148-153.

Volutidae
Gastropods described in 2004